Lewis Roca Rothgerber Christie is a U.S. law firm with approximately 300 attorneys across ten offices in Arizona, California, Colorado, Nevada, and New Mexico. Its administrative offices are located in Phoenix, where it was founded in 1950 as Lewis & Roca. In 2015, The American Lawyer magazine ranked the firm number 179 in its annual Top 200 U.S. law firms list. It is one of the top five law firms in Arizona

The firm has handled pro bono cases including Miranda v. Arizona, 384 U.S. 436 (1966), in which partners John P. Frank, John Flynn and others represented Ernesto Miranda in the landmark US Supreme Court case, giving rise to "Miranda Rights."

Practice areas

The firm represents clients across a range of practice areas, managed through primary practice groups for litigation, intellectual property, business transactions, gaming law, and regulatory and government relations.

The firm’s largest practice group, litigation, includes lawyers in areas including religious institutions, insurance, labor and employment law, IP litigation, product liability, appellate and real estate litigation. Attorneys handle commercial disputes before state and federal trial and appellate courts and administrative tribunals.

Many attorneys in the firm’s second largest practice group, intellectual property, have science and engineering backgrounds. The group handles cases of IP procurement, enforcement and defense, including IP licensing, IP strategy, prosecution and litigation for patents, trademarks, copyrights and trade secrets, and Internet law and domain disputes.

The business transactions practice group includes real estate and construction, corporate services, company formation, mergers and acquisitions, insurance, health care services, financial services, land development, and negotiating transactions.

The gaming practice group supports casino operators, suppliers, state and local governments, communities, businesses, non-profit organizations, tribal governments and others in addressing casino gaming law including Native American and riverboat casinos, racinos, interactive and mobile gaming, poker and interstate horse racing.

Lewis Roca has government relations practices in Arizona, Colorado and Nevada, focusing on public policy.

History
The firm was founded in Phoenix as Lewis and Roca, by Orme Lewis and Paul Roca in 1950, with clients in Arizona and the southwest. The firm grew to 180 lawyers with offices in Phoenix, Tucson, Las Vegas, Reno, Albuquerque and Silicon Valley, and practices within litigation, real estate and business transactions, natural resources, gaming, intellectual property, and bankruptcy.

In 2013 the firm merged with Denver-based Rothgerber Johnson & Lyons, which has operated in the Rocky Mountain region since 1903 with 75 lawyers and offices in Denver, Colorado Springs and Casper, and practice areas in litigation, real estate, banking, insurance, energy infrastructure and religious institutions. The merged firm was renamed Lewis Roca Rothgerber LLP.

On January 1, 2016, Lewis Roca Rothgerber combined with Christie, Parker & Hale, a Los Angeles-based intellectual property firm, to become Lewis Roca Rothgerber Christie LLP. Founded in 1954 by James Christie, Robert Parker and Russell Hale, CPH had included about 40 attorneys in Los Angeles and Orange County and had handled patent work for SpaceShipOne, the first privately funded human space flight, among other clients.

Notable alumni 
Notable alumni of the firm include former Wyoming Governor and ambassador to Ireland Mike Sullivan; former Arizona Governor and Secretary of the U.S. Department of Homeland Security Janet Napolitano; Honolulu civil rights attorney David C. Schutter; and James Lyons, who was Special Advisor to the President and Secretary of State for Economic Initiatives in Ireland and Northern Ireland.

Notable judicial alumni include Ninth Circuit Court of Appeals Judge Mary M. Schroeder, United States District Court for the District of Arizona Judge John C. Hinderaker, former Arizona Supreme Court Chief Justice Scott Bales, and Arizona Court of Appeals Judge David Weinzweig.

Phoenix lawyers John Paul Frank and John J. Flynn of Lewis and Roca and others represented Ernesto Miranda on a pro bono basis, which led to the landmark Miranda v. Arizona decision on June 13, 1966 in which the U.S. Supreme Court declared the specific rights set of for criminal defendants. The Miranda warning is the formal warning that is now required to be given by police in the United States to criminal suspects in police custody (or in a custodial situation) before they are interrogated, in accordance with the Miranda ruling.

Recognition and rankings 
Lewis Roca Rothgerber Christie attorneys were included in the 2016 "Best Law Firms" rankings by U.S. News & World Report.

Locations
 Phoenix, Arizona
 Tucson, Arizona
 Los Angeles, California
 Silicon Valley, California
 Denver, Colorado
 Colorado Springs, Colorado
 Las Vegas, Nevada
 Reno, Nevada
 Albuquerque, New Mexico

References

External links
 Lewis Roca Rothgerber Christie homepage
 Chambers USA profile
 Profile from LexisNexis Martindale-Hubbell
 Organizational Profile  from The National Law Review

Law firms established in 1950
Law firms based in Phoenix, Arizona